The Virginia Manufactory of Arms was a state-owned firearms manufacturer and arsenal in what is today Richmond, Virginia. It was established by the Commonwealth of Virginia in 1798 to supply the Virginia militia with firearms and related items such as swords and bayonets. The factory originally operated from 1802 or 1803 to 1821.

In 1861 at the start of the American Civil War, the works were revived as the Richmond Armory (or Richmond Arsenal), and operated until its destruction in the Evacuation Fire in April 1865.

History
On January 23, 1798, an act of the Virginia General Assembly established the Virginia Manufactory of Arms to ensure a reliable supply of armaments for the state militia.  By 1821 when production ceased, other reliable sources of firearms existed, and the General Assembly felt production at the armory was no longer necessary, though it retained its storage function.

Virginia appropriated funds in January 1860 to modernize the Virginia Manufactory with arms-making machinery manufactured in England; but the confrontation at Fort Sumter initiated the Union blockade which prevented delivery of the machinery.  In 1861, the Confederacy captured the Union-held town of Harper's Ferry in northern Virginia, and salvaged the machinery used to manufacture Springfield Model 1855 muskets. The machinery was shipped on the Winchester and Potomac Railroad to Winchester, Virginia, where it was transferred by wagons over the Valley Pike to be reloaded onto the Manassas Gap Railroad at Strasburg, Virginia for delivery to Richmond.

The Old State Armory building with Harpers Ferry Machinery was transferred to Confederate States control in June 1861. Production of Richmond rifles began in October 1861 and continued until the supply of wooden stocks was exhausted in January 1865. Most of the facility was destroyed during the Evacuation Fire of 1865. The rolling mills survived destruction, and became part of the Tredegar Iron Works after the war. Portions of the main arsenal building survived in ruins into the late 19th century, until finally being demolished in 1900.

See also
Richmond rifle
Bellona Arsenal

References

History of Richmond, Virginia
Firearm manufacturers of the United States
Armories in Virginia
1798 establishments in Virginia